Newtown is a suburb in the City of Ipswich, Queensland, Australia.

Geography 
Newtown is bordered by Queens Park to the west, to the north by Brisbane Road, the city's main arterial link to the Ipswich Motorway.

A small set of shops lies on the five-ways intersection where Brisbane Road, Queen Victoria Parade, Glebe Road and Chermside Road meet.

History
The suburb takes its name from a housing estate sold by John Rankin about 1865.

Newtown State School opened on 1 July 1882. In 1915 the school was moved to a new location and renamed Silkstone State School.

Heritage listings

Newtown contains a number of heritage-listed sites including:
 68 Chermside Street : St Michaels Nursing Home
 4 Rockton Street: Rockton

Transport
Newtown is serviced by East Ipswich railway station, which provides access to regular Queensland Rail City network services to Brisbane, Ipswich and Rosewood via Ipswich.

Amenities
 Spring Garden Park
 Newtown Park

Education 
There are no schools in Newtown. The nearest primary schools are Ipswich Central State School in Ipswich, Silkstone State School in Silkstone and Ipswich East State School in East Ipswich. The nearest secondary schools are Bremer State High School in Ipswich and Bundamba State Secondary College in Bundamba.

References
{"type":"FeatureCollection","crs":{"type":"name","properties":{"name":"EPSG:4326"}},"features":[{"type":"Feature","id":2571,"geometry":{"type":"Polygon","coordinates":[[[152.77941426600012,-27.620251312999983],[152.77943442800006,-27.620135478999941],[152.77970934700011,-27.61855529199994],[152.77974586200003,-27.618348545999936],[152.78005558300003,-27.616598158999977],[152.78007749500011,-27.616474292999953],[152.78020031000005,-27.61649114599993],[152.78081336600007,-27.616575277999971],[152.78104503500003,-27.616606801999978],[152.78174836200003,-27.616702466999982],[152.78198506700005,-27.616734660999953],[152.78259596200007,-27.616817764999951],[152.78281251300007,-27.616847209999946],[152.78291324500003,-27.616860918999976],[152.78293726600009,-27.61677018599994],[152.78304725100008,-27.616133339999976],[152.78307837200009,-27.615953169999955],[152.7831859370001,-27.615330382999957],[152.78321686400011,-27.615151263999962],[152.78332585100009,-27.614520236999965],[152.7833568530001,-27.614340751999976],[152.78346520700006,-27.613713405999931],[152.78346843300005,-27.613610639999933],[152.7833755690001,-27.613598174999936],[152.7830045820001,-27.613548345999959],[152.78290351500004,-27.613534800999957],[152.78280244000007,-27.613521255999956],[152.7820096690001,-27.613414927999941],[152.78182224900002,-27.613389938999944],[152.78160253200008,-27.613360367999974],[152.78139781200002,-27.613332844999945],[152.78111822200003,-27.613295584999946],[152.78090883000004,-27.613267592999932],[152.78052135600012,-27.613215073999982],[152.78034862900006,-27.613191619999952],[152.77990800100008,-27.613131872999929],[152.77971164100006,-27.613097674999949],[152.77933149800003,-27.613045609999972],[152.7791300340001,-27.613018035999971],[152.77874727500011,-27.612965650999968],[152.77851472800012,-27.612941048999971],[152.77827797800012,-27.612908414999936],[152.77807219300007,-27.612879558999964],[152.77749773900007,-27.612800143999948],[152.77729622300012,-27.612772307999933],[152.77712492600006,-27.612748637999971],[152.7768773140001,-27.612714424999979],[152.77668948500002,-27.612688481999953],[152.77665855000009,-27.612684204999937],[152.77627489000008,-27.612853385999983],[152.77545470700011,-27.613215036999975],[152.77519404900011,-27.61332946999994],[152.7714130060001,-27.61499794599996],[152.77118776700001,-27.615097343999935],[152.77112682200004,-27.615435935999983],[152.77095515300005,-27.616411648999929],[152.7709236070001,-27.616591743999948],[152.77051483100001,-27.618925868999952],[152.77049920000002,-27.619015290999982],[152.77060048300007,-27.619029655999952],[152.77160818100003,-27.619172639999931],[152.77181981500007,-27.619202687999973],[152.77261598400003,-27.619315348999976],[152.77284887400003,-27.619348860999935],[152.77383233600005,-27.619486115999962],[152.77405060800004,-27.619517132999931],[152.77444149600012,-27.619571126999972],[152.77471128100012,-27.619606859999976],[152.77498179700001,-27.61964508899996],[152.77567323300002,-27.619740202999935],[152.77589222000006,-27.61976826199998],[152.77685930600012,-27.619901187999972],[152.77708572900008,-27.619932263999942],[152.77807686500012,-27.620067968999933],[152.77828955700011,-27.620097159999943],[152.7792716030001,-27.620231769999975],[152.77941426600012,-27.620251312999983]]]},"properties":{"OBJECTID":2571,"ADMINTYPENAME":"LOCALITY","ADMINAREANAME":"NEWTOWN, IPSWICH CITY","LOC_CODE":"3573","LOCALITY":"Newtown","LGA":"Ipswich City","CA_AREA_SQKM":0.71898399999999996,"SHAPE_Length":0.035826105676125049,"SHAPE_Area":6.5731759486144505e-05}}]}

External links

 

Suburbs of Ipswich, Queensland